This is a list of all seasons played by Chelsea Football Club in English and European football, from their inaugural season in 1905–06 to their last completed season (2021–22). It details their record in every major competition entered, as well as the top goalscorers for each season. Top scorers in bold were also the top scorers in Chelsea's division that season.

The club have won every major domestic and international honour, and have never been outside the top two divisions in English football. In total, Chelsea have won six League Championships (the First Division and its successor, the Premier League), eight FA Cups, five League Cups, one FIFA Club World Cup, two UEFA Champions Leagues, two UEFA Europa Leagues, and two UEFA Cup Winners' Cups. The club have also won various minor honours, including four FA Community/Charity Shields, two Full Members' Cups, and two UEFA Super Cups.

Key

Prem – Premier League
Div 1 – Football League First Division
Div 2 – Football League Second Division
FA Cup – FA Cup
EFL Cup – EFL Cup
CS – FA Community Shield
CL – UEFA Champions League
EL – UEFA Europa League
CW – UEFA Cup Winners' Cup
SC – UEFA Super Cup
CWC – FIFA Club World Cup
FM – Full Members' Cup

Pld – Matches played
W – Matches won
D – Matches drawn
L – Matches lost
GF – Goals for
GA – Goals against
Pts – Points
Pos – Final position

1Q – First qualifying round
2Q – Second qualifying round
3Q – Third qualifying round
PO – Play-off round
R32 – Round of 32
R16 – Round of 16
R1 – Round 1
R2 – Round 2
R3 – Round 3
R4 – Round 4
R5 – Round 5
R6 – Round 6
QF – Quarter-finals
SF – Semi-finals
RU – Runners-up
W – Winners

Seasons

Notes

References

soccerbase.com Chelsea statistics

 

Seasons
 
Chelsea F.C.